Muzzy in Gondoland (often shortened to simply Muzzy) is a British animated television film, first created by the BBC in 1986, as a way of teaching English as a second language. The English version of Muzzy features the voices of Willie Rushton, Miriam Margolyes, Susan Sheridan, Derek Griffiths, Jack May, and Benjamin Whitrow. DMP Organization later acquired the rights to Muzzy and translated it into other languages (see below). It is unknown, however, who plays whom in the various dubbed versions of the film.

A sequel, Muzzy Comes Back, was released in 1989.

Digital Education developed a new version of the course, which was released in 2013. The 2013 version is CGI and is a shot-for-shot remake of the original film.

Cast
 Jack May as Muzzy (a furry, greenish-blue extraterrestrial)
 Willie Rushton as the King (a lion), and some additional voices
 Miriam Margolyes as the Queen (a rat), and Norman's human wife 
 Susan Sheridan as Princess Sylvia (a rat), and some additional voices
 Derek Griffiths as Bob (a mouse), Corvax (a green goblin), and some additional voices
 Benjamin Whitrow as Norman (a human)

As a language course
DMP Organization, the worldwide distributor of the Muzzy courses, has licensed the development of the New Muzzy to Digital Education SA. There are various distributors of the course around the world. The original system was available in the following languages: French, Spanish, Italian, German, Welsh (advertised only on S4C in Wales), Irish (advertised as Muzzy Mór, literally Big Muzzy) Scottish Gaelic (Muzzy Mòr), Esperanto, and Japanese (vocabulary builder only).

References

External links
 

1986 films
BBC Film films
British television films
British animated films
English-language education television programming
1980s English-language films
1980s British films